Williamson Mountain, elevation , is a peak in the Cascade Range in the U.S. state of Oregon. It is named after Lt. Robert S. Williamson, who with Lt. Philip Sheridan took part in the Pacific Railroad Surveys in central Oregon in 1855. The United States Board on Geographic Names approved the name in 1931. Before that, the peak was known by its Chinook Jargon name of Leloo Mountain (Wolf Mountain), derived from the French le loup (the wolf). 

The mountain lies slightly east of the border between Lane County and Deschutes County in the Deschutes National Forest and the Three Sisters Wilderness, southwest of Mount Bachelor. The Six Lakes Trail crosses the mountain between Lucky Lake to the southeast and Senoj Lake to the northwest.

References

Mountains of Deschutes County, Oregon
Mountains of Oregon
Deschutes National Forest
Volcanoes of Deschutes County, Oregon
Pleistocene shield volcanoes
Shield volcanoes of the United States